Kim Sun-woo may refer to:

 Sun-woo Kim (born 1977), South Korean baseball player
 Kim Sun-woo (footballer, born 1983), South Korean football forward (K League 1)
 Kim Sun-woo (footballer, born 1986), South Korean football midfielder (K League 2)
 Kim Sun-woo (footballer, born 1993), South Korean football midfielder (K League 1)
 Kim Sun-woo (pentathlete) (born 1996), South Korean modern pentathlete

See also
Kim Seon-wu, poet